Albatross is a 2015 Icelandic comedy drama film directed and written by Snævar Sölvi Sölvason. It stars Hansel Eagle as a young man who follows his girlfriend up to the Westfjords for a summer, prior to beginning a university course he’s not passionate about, and soon finds himself dumped and directionless. The film premiered on 18 June 2015.

The film was funded independently, with its post production financing coming through the Karolina Fund crowdfunding site.

Cast
 Hansel Eagle as Tommi
 Pálmi Gestsson as Kjartan
 Finnbogi Dagur Sigurðsson as Finni
 Gunnar Kristinsson as Kiddi
 Birna Hjaltalín Pálmadóttir as Rakel
 Ársæll Níelsson as Þröstur Örn
 Guðmundur Kristjánsson as Þrándur
 Gabriela Vieira as Maria

References

External links

2015 films
2010s Icelandic-language films
2015 comedy-drama films
Icelandic comedy-drama films